Pilocrocis nubilinea is a moth in the family Crambidae. It was described by George Thomas Bethune-Baker in 1909. It is found in the Democratic Republic of the Congo (Orientale).

References

Pilocrocis
Moths described in 1909
Moths of Africa
Endemic fauna of the Democratic Republic of the Congo